TV-Kumamoto Co., Ltd. , also known as TKU,is a Japanese television station, founded in 1968 and headquartered in Kumamoto, Japan. It started broadcasting in 1969. 

It is affiliated with the FNN and FNS, and it is the 2nd commercial television station in Kumamoto prefecture.  On December 1, 2006, TKU started digital terrestrial television broadcasting.

References

Fuji News Network
Television stations in Japan
Television channels and stations established in 1968
1968 establishments in Japan